Mabel is an English female given name derived from the Latin amabilis, "lovable, dear".

History
Amabilis of Riom (died 475) was a French male saint who logically would have assumed the name Amabilis upon entering the priesthood: his veneration may have resulted in Amabilis being used as both a male and female name, or the name's female usage may have been initiated by the female saint Amabilis of Rouen (died 634), the daughter of an Anglo-Saxon king who would have adopted the name Amabilis upon becoming a nun.  

Brought by the Normans—as Amable—to the British Isles, the name was there common as both Amabel and the abbreviated Mabel throughout the Middle Ages, with  Mabel subsequently remaining common until , from which point its usage was largely restricted to Ireland, Mabel there being perceived as a variant of the Celtic name Maeve, until the name had a Victorian revival in Britain, facilitated by the 1853 publication of the novel The Heir of Redclyffe by Charlotte M. Yonge, which features an Irish character named Mabel Kilcoran; Yonge's novel also features a character named Amabel, but her novel only significantly boosted the popularity of the name in the form Mabel, which became immensely popular in both the British Isles and the United States. 

At the start of the 20th century, Mabel's popularity began a slow decline which accelerated from the 1930s; the name has seen very light usage since the 1960s. Due to its origin as an abridgement of Amabel it has been surmised that Mabel was originally pronounced with a short A, the name's pronunciation with a long A dating only from its mid-19th-century revival.

Notable people
Mabel McVey (born 1996), English singer and songwriter
Mabel of Bury St. Edmunds, 13th-century embroiderer
Princess Mabel of Orange-Nassau (born 1968), member of the Dutch royalty
Mabel Albertson (1901–1992), American character actress
Mabel Esther Allan (1915–1998), British author 
Mabel Lucie Atwell (1879–1964) British children's illustrator and author
Mabel Marks Bacon (1876–1966), American hotelier
Mabel Ballin (1887–1958), American actress
Mabel de Bellême (died 1079), Countess of Shrewsbury and Lady of Arundel
Mabel Besant-Scott (1870–1952), British occultist
Mabel Thorp Boardman (1860–1946), American philanthropist involved with the American Red Cross
Mabel Browne, Countess of Kildare (c. 1536 – 1610)
Mabel Cheung (born 1950), film director from Hong Kong
Mabel Colhoun (1905–1992), Irish photographer, teacher and archaeologist
Mabel Condemarín (1931–2004), Chilean educator
Mabel Wheeler Daniels (1877–1971), American composer, conductor, and teacher
Mabel Dove Danquah (1905–1984), Ghanaian journalist, political activist and creative writer
Mabel Dearmer (1872–1915), English novelist, dramatist and children's book author/illustrator
Mabel DeWare (1926-2022), Canadian politician, curler, and retired senator
Mabel Smith Douglass (1874–1933), American academic
Mabel Fairbanks (1915–2001), American figure skater
Mabel FitzRobert, Countess of Gloucester (c. 1100 – 1157), Anglo-Norman noblewoman
Lady Mabel Wentworth-Fitzwilliam (1870–1951), English politician
Mabel B. Holle (1920–2011), player in the All-American Girls Professional Baseball
Mabel Gardiner Hubbard (1857–1923), wife of Alexander Graham Bell
Mabel Grammer (1915–2002), American journalist
Mabel Farrington Gifford (1880–1962), American speech therapist
Mabel Jones (c. 1865-1923), British physician and suffragette sympathiser
Mabel King (1932–1999), American singer and actress
Mabel Hyde Kittredge (1867–1955), home economist and social worker
Mabel Lang (1917–2010), American archaeologist
Mabel Ping-Hua Lee (1896-1966), Chinese advocate for women's suffrage in the United States 
Mabel Lee, Australian translator
Mabel Lockerby (1882–1976), Canadian artist
Mabel Dodge Luhan (1879–1962), American patron of the arts
Mabel Manzotti (1938–2012), Argentine film, stage and television actress
Mabel Mercer (1900–1994), American cabaret singer
Mabel Mosquera (born 1969), Colombian weightlifter
Mabel Normand (1892–1930), American comic actress
Mabel Paige (1880–1954), American stage and film actress
Mabel Parton (1881–1962), English tennis player
Mabel Cosgrove Wodehouse Pearse, Irish writer
Mabel Poulton (1901–1994), English actress
Mabel Pryde (1871–1918), Scottish artist
Mabel Rayner (c.1890-1948), English botanist
Mabel Sonnier Savoie (1939–2013), American singer and guitar player 
Mabel Seeley (1903–1991), American mystery writer
Mabel A. Shaw (1880 – June 15, 1962)
Mabel L. Smith (1924–1972), known professionally as Big Maybelle, American R&B singer
Mabel Stark (1889–1968), tiger trainer
Mabel Keaton Staupers (1890–1989), pioneer in the American nursing profession
Mabel St Clair Stobart (1862–1954), British suffragist and aid-worker
Mabel Strickland (1899–1988), Maltese journalist and politician
Mabel Taliaferro (1887–1979), American actress
Mabel Loomis Todd (1856–1932), American editor and writer
Mabel Todd (disambiguation), several people
Mabel Landrum Torrey (1886–1974), American sculptor 
Mabel Vernon (1883–1975), American suffragist
Mabel Rose Welch (1871–1959), American painter of portrait miniatures
Mabel Walker Willebrandt (1889–1963), U.S. Assistant Attorney General from 1921 to 1929 under the Warren G. Harding administration
Mabel Sine Wadsworth (1910–2006), American birth control activist and women's health educator
Mabel May Woodward (1877–1945), American impressionist painter
Mabel Martin Wyrick (1913–2003), American writer
Mabel Yuan (born 1987), Chinese actress and singer

Stage name or ring name
 Mabel Matiz (born 1985), Turkish pop singer
 Mabel (singer) (born 1996), English pop singer, daughter of singer Neneh Cherry
 Mabel (wrestler), a ring name of American professional wrestler Nelson Lee Frazier Jr. (1971–2014)

Fictional characters
Mabel Mora, a female lead character in the Hulu web television series Only Murders in the Building
Mabel Darcy, daughter of Bridget Jones and Mark Darcy, in the Bridget Jones's Diary series
Mabel Motley, female lead character on the 1976–2000 comic strip Motley's Crew
Mabel Pines, a main character in the animated series Gravity Falls
Mabel Stanley, a lead character in The Pirates of Penzance
Mabel Timbertoes, a child character in the Timbertoes series for Highlights for Children
Mabel the Ugly Stepsister, from the animated film Shrek the Third
Mabel Foyle, Viscountess Gillingham (born The Honourable Mabel Lane Fox), wife of Anthony “Tony” Foyle, Viscount Gillingham in the TV show Downton Abbey

References

Feminine given names
English feminine given names